The AScX index, derived from Amsterdam Small Cap Index, also known as Small Cap index or simply Small Cap, is a stock market index composed of Dutch companies that trade on Euronext Amsterdam, formerly known as the Amsterdam Stock Exchange. The index was started in 2005. It is composed of the 25 funds that trade on the exchange and that rank 51–75 in size. The funds that rank 1–25 in size are represented in the AEX index and the funds that rank 26–50 in size are represented in the AMX index. The composition is reviewed twice a year.

Composition
The AScX index has the following composition as of 14 June 2018.

See also
 AEX index, the market index of the 25 largest funds on Euronext Amsterdam.
 AMX index, the market index of the next 25 largest funds on Euronext Amsterdam.

References

External links
 

Dutch stock market indices
Euronext indices